René Reinumägi  (born 21 July 1974, in Tallinn) is an Estonian film director, scriptwriter and actor,. With Jaak Kilmi he shares nomination for Grand Prix Asturias at the Gijón International Film Festival, nomination for Golden St. George and the winning of Special Jury Prize at the 26th Moscow International Film Festival in 2004.

Filmography
2003   Director of the youth film Sigade Revolutsioon (Engl. “Revolution of Pigs”),     OÜ Sigade Revolutsioon
2002   Screenwriter for the youth film Sigade revolutsioon (Engl. “Revolution of Pigs”), OÜ Sigade Revolutsioon
1999  actor and co-writer of the short feature film Inimkaamera (Engl. “Human Camera”), Rudolf Konimois Film, director Jaak Kilmi
1999 actor and co-writer of the short feature film Tähesôit (Engl. “Star Ride”), Exitfilm, director Jaak Kilmi
1998  actor in the short feature film Libarebased ja kooljad (Engl. “Werefoxes    and Undead”), Eesti Telefilm, TPÜ Film-Video, director Rainer Sarnet
1998 actor and co-writer of the short feature film Külla tuli (Engl. “Came to Visit”), Eesti Telefilm, TPÜ Film-Video, director Jaak Kilmi
The film was awarded Grand Prix at Poitier International Student Film Festival in 1998 (France); special prize at Premiers Plans Film Festival in Angers in 1999 (France); main prize in Oberhausen Short Film Festival in 1999 (Germany), Wunderkind Award at See-Süchte Film Festival in Potsdam-Babelsberg in 1999 (Germany) and jury’s special Prize in Stuttgart – Ludwigsburg in 1999 (Germany)
1998  actor in short feature film McCulloc,  director Marko Raat

References

External links

Estonian film directors
1974 births
Living people
Estonian Academy of Music and Theatre alumni
People from Tallinn
Male actors from Tallinn
Estonian male film actors